Joël Egloff (born 1970, Créhange in Moselle) is a contemporary French writer and screenwriter.

Biography 
After his baccalaureate, Joel Egloff studied history in Strasbourg and then enrolled in a school of cinema, the ESEC (École supérieure libre d’études cinématographiques) in Paris. He wrote scenarios and worked as assistant director. He is now devoted to writing. He is the author of five novels, including  L'Étourdissement  which got the Prix du Livre Inter 2005.

L’Homme que l’on prenait pour un autre (2008) combines strange poetry and black humor. It is the story of an individual with such an ordinary face and a face so common that he is "daily taken for someone else".

Work

Novels 
 Edmond Ganglion & fils
 Monaco, Paris: Éditions du Rocher, 1999, 162 p. (Littérature). 
 Extrait in 12 extraits de romans de la rentrée, supplément de Lire n° 277 "spécial livres de poche", 07/1999, p. 37-43.
 Paris: Éd. France loisirs, 2000, 162 p.  
 Paris: Éditions Gallimard, 2001, 162 p. (Folio n° 3485).  
 Monaco ; Paris : Éd. du Rocher, 2009, 162 p. (Littérature). 

 Ce que je fais là assis par terre
 Monaco ; Paris : Éd. du Rocher, 2003, 154 p. (Littérature). 

 L'Étourdissement
 Paris : Buchet/Chastel, 2004, 142 p. 
 Paris : le Grand livre du mois, 2005, 142 p. 
 Paris : Éd. France loisirs, 2006, 187 p. (Courts romans & autres nouvelles). 
 Paris : Gallimard, 2006, 140 p. (Folio n° 4418). 

 L’Homme que l’on prenait pour un autre
 Paris: Buchet/Chastel, 2008, 202 p. 
 Paris: Pocket, 2009, 153 p. (Pocket Best n° 13722). 

 J’enquête
 Buchet-Chastel, 2016, 288 p.

Short stories 
 Collection of short stories

 Les Ensoleillés
 Monaco, Paris : Éd. du Rocher, 2000, 157 p. (Littérature). 
 Paris, Gallimard, 2002, 157 p. (Folio n° 3651). 

 Libellules -  de la Nouvelle 2012
 Paris : Buchet/Chastel, 2012, 192 p. 
 Paris : Gallimard, 2014, 147 p. (Folio n° 5706). 

 Short stories
 "Ta maison, l’assurance te la remboursera". Le Figaro littéraire, 20 July 2007. 
 "La Grande Réparation". In Bienvenue en Transylvanie : neuf histoires de vampires, anthologie. Points n° 2971, 2013.

Preface 
 La Source  by Hubert Mingarelli. Sainte-Anastasie  : Cadex, 2012, 52 p. (Texte au carré).

Prizes and awards 
 1999: Prix Alain-Fournier for Edmond Ganglion & fils (Éd. du Rocher)
 2000: Prix Erckmann-Chatrian for Les Ensoleillés (Éd. du Rocher)
 2004: Prix de l'Humour noir for Ce que je fais là assis par terre (Éd. du Rocher)
 2005: Prix du Livre Inter and Prix du Roman des Libraires Édouard-Leclerc for L'Étourdissement (Buchet/Chastel)
 2012: Grand prix Société des gens de lettres de la Nouvelle for Libellules (Buchet/Chastel)

Adaptations of his works

Theatre 
 2007: L'Étourdissement. Creation at Théâtre Confluences (20th arrondissement of Paris, 24 October to 25 November 2007).

Short films 
 2007: Les Ensoleillés. Direction Didier Massot. Jeu: sophie Bezard. Cadre: Loetitia Candellier. Duration: 8 min 42 s. Short film shot during a stage of leadership of actors. It is the result of a work done by the director with the actress Sophie Bezard on a monologue of the collection Les Ensoleillés.
 2014 : L’Étourdissement. Direction: Gérard Pautonnier. Production: Elzevir Films & Bactery Films. Duration: 23 min. With Arthur Dupont, Philippe Duquesne, Pascale Arbillot, Nicolas Vaude, Féodor Atkine, Miglen Mirtchev, Éric Bougnon, Marie Berto.

Bibliography 
 Chronicles
 Ferniot, Christine. "Étourdis et confus". Télérama, 12 January 2008, n° 3026.
 Fillon, Alexandre. "Un autre monde". Livres-Hebdo, 23 November 2007, n° 711, p. 39.
 Interviews
 Labat, Julien. "L’art de l’absurde". Page des libraires, January–February 2008, n° 118, p. 24.

External links 
 Joël Egloff on Babelio
 Joël Egloff: Entre Burlesque et Ironie on bscnews.fr
 Joël Egloff - J'enquête on YouTube
 J'’enquête de Joël Egloff on Tête de lecture
 "La chronique de Jacques Plaine" : J'enquête, de Joël Egloff on L'Essor (22 September 2016)

21st-century French non-fiction writers
French male screenwriters
Prix Alain-Fournier winners
Prix du Livre Inter winners
1970 births
People from Moselle (department)
Living people
21st-century French screenwriters